Game Makers is a TV show that aired on G4 from September 4, 2003, to 2006. The series followed the process of video game development, as a company attempts to finish a new video game in time for shipment. Game Makers aired infrequently and was referred to as a "G4 Special Presentation" rather than a separate entity. The series was cancelled and taken off air in early 2006.

After the revamp of Icons in June 2006, the classic game based episodes of Icons began to air under the name Game Makers, with no relation to the original version of Game Makers.

References

G4 (American TV network) original programming
Documentary television series about video games
2003 American television series debuts
2006 American television series endings